Nevio de Zordo (sometimes listed as Nevio De Zordo, 11 March 1943 – 27 March 2014) was an Italian bobsledder who competed from the mid-1960s until the early 1970s. He won the silver medal in the four-man event at the 1972 Winter Olympics in Sapporo.

De Zordo also won four medals at the FIBT World Championships with two golds (Two-man: 1969, Four-man: 1970) and two silvers (Two-man: 1967, Four-man: 1965).

References

External links
 Bobsleigh two-man world championship medalists since 1931
 Bobsleigh four-man world championship medalists since 1930
 
 
 

1943 births
2014 deaths
Bobsledders at the 1972 Winter Olympics
Bobsledders at the 1976 Winter Olympics
Italian male bobsledders
Olympic bobsledders of Italy
Olympic silver medalists for Italy
Olympic medalists in bobsleigh
Medalists at the 1972 Winter Olympics